Sean Patrick Paul O'Sullivan, CM (January 1, 1952 – March 9, 1989) was a Canadian politician who left politics and became a Roman Catholic priest.

Born in 1952 in Hamilton, Ontario, O'Sullivan showed an interest in politics at a young age: when he was 11 years old he worked for Ellen Fairclough in her election campaign and met John Diefenbaker for the first time. He was educated at Bishop Ryan Catholic Secondary School and Brock University in St. Catharines. When he was just 15 years old he was named Western Ontario representative of the Youth for Diefenbaker movement.  This movement was formed in Ottawa to engage support of Canada's young conservatives for John Diefenbaker at the leadership convention.  In 1970, at age 18, he was chosen as president of the Young Progressive Conservatives of Canada.

In 1971, Diefenbaker appointed O'Sullivan as his executive assistant, and in the 1972 election, the O'Sullivan was elected the Progressive Conservative MP for the riding of Hamilton-Wentworth; at 20 years 10 months, O'Sullivan becoming the youngest member elected to the House of Commons of Canada ever at that point (in 1974, Liberal Claude-André Lachance, elected at 20 years 3 months, became the youngest-ever MP, after which New Democrat Pierre-Luc Dusseault beat that record in 2011, elected at 19 years 11 months). He was re-elected in 1974. It was O'Sullivan's private members bill in 1975 that gained recognition for the beaver as Canada's official animal symbol.

In 1977, O'Sullivan announced that he was leaving politics to enter the Roman Catholic priesthood, eventually becoming Director of Vocations for the Archdiocese of Toronto, as well as publisher of The Catholic Register newspaper.

O'Sullivan learned he was suffering from leukemia in 1983. After treatment, the disease was in remission. During a Brock University convocation ceremony in 1985, Father O'Sullivan was conferred an honorary degree and he delivered the convocation address.  In 1986, he was made a Member of the Order of Canada. With the return of his illness in 1989, O'Sullivan entered Princess Margaret Hospital in Toronto for a bone marrow transplant. He died there on March 9, 1989, aged 37.

References

External links
 
 Sean O'Sullivan Fonds RG 431 Brock University Library Digital Repository

1952 births
1989 deaths
Brock University alumni
Deaths from leukemia
Members of the House of Commons of Canada from Ontario
Members of the Order of Canada
Politicians from Hamilton, Ontario
Progressive Conservative Party of Canada MPs
Deaths from cancer in Ontario
20th-century Canadian Roman Catholic priests